Pollock Pines is a census-designated place (CDP) in El Dorado County, California, United States. It is part of the Sacramento–Arden-Arcade–Roseville Metropolitan Statistical Area. The population was 7,112 at the 2020 census, up from 6,871 at the 2010 census.

Geography

The town sits on the west slope of the Sierra Nevada.

The area encompassing Pollock Pines is in a heavily timbered mountain region situated along the ridgetop on the south side of the South Fork of the American River. It is considered a "very high fire hazard severity zone", although it received grants from the state's cap and trade carbon trading program to trim vegetation on the ridgeline south of Highway 50.

Climate
According to the Köppen Climate Classification system, Pollock Pines has a warm-summer Mediterranean climate, abbreviated "Csa" on climate maps.

History
One of the original Pony Express stations (Twelve Mile House) was located in Pollock Pines. The location was covered by the restaurant called Sportsman's Hall. The "Hall", which was originally opened in 1852 by John and James Blair, who had immigrated from Scotland, still operates today. It is the site of California Registered Historical Landmark #704, which reads: "This was the site of Sportsman's Hall, also known as Twelve-Mile House, the hotel operated in the latter 1850s and 1860s by John and James Blair. A stopping place for stages and teams of the Comstock, it became a relay station of the Central Overland Pony Express. Here, at 7:40 A.M., April 4, 1860, pony rider William (Sam) Hamilton riding in from Placerville, handed the express mail to Warren Upson, who, two minutes later, sped on his way eastward."

Pollock Pines was primarily a lumber community (the town is named for H.R. Pollock, who operated a lumber mill in the area in the early 1900s). The first post office opened in 1936. The name celebrates the Pollock family, who were early settlers.

In 2014 the King Fire burned  in the Eldorado National Forest and on private land, destroying 80 structures, including residences and outbuildings near Pollock Pines. The cause of the fire, which was started September 13 and was extinguished October 9, was determined to be arson. The fire threatened thousands of homes as well as reservoirs that provide water and electricity to portions of California. The fire and the post-burn area were extensively studied by NASA's wildfires program which collected data on pre-burn forest conditions, fuel moisture, fire behavior, burned area and severity, post-fire forest structure, erosion, re-vegetation, and targeted mitigation for the fire science and management communities.

Demographics

2010
The 2010 United States Census reported that Pollock Pines had a population of 6,871. The racial makeup of Pollock Pines was 6,195 (90.2%) White, 18 (0.3%) African American, 128 (1.9%) Native American, 56 (0.8%) Asian, 3 (0.0%) Pacific Islander, 251 (3.7%) from other races, and 220 (3.2%) from two or more races. Hispanic or Latino of any race were 713 persons (10.4%).

The Census reported that 6,849 people (99.7% of the population) lived in households, 22 (0.3%) lived in non-institutionalized group quarters, and 0 (0%) were institutionalized.

There were 2,827 households, out of which 795 (28.1%) had children under the age of 18 living in them, 1,484 (52.5%) were opposite-sex married couples living together, 264 (9.3%) had a female householder with no husband present, 168 (5.9%) had a male householder with no wife present.  There were 201 (7.1%) unmarried opposite-sex partnerships, and 25 (0.9%) same-sex married couples or partnerships. 733 households (25.9%) were made up of individuals, and 269 (9.5%) had someone living alone who was 65 years of age or older. The average household size was 2.42.  There were 1,916 families (67.8% of all households); the average family size was 2.88.

The population was spread out, with 1,463 people (21.3%) under the age of 18, 484 people (7.0%) aged 18 to 24, 1,511 people (22.0%) aged 25 to 44, 2,285 people (33.3%) aged 45 to 64, and 1,128 people (16.4%) who were 65 years of age or older.  The median age was 44.8 years. For every 100 females, there were 101.6 males.  For every 100 females age 18 and over, there were 101.5 males.

The homeowner vacancy rate was 3.2%; the rental vacancy rate was 11.9%.  5,063 people (73.7% of the population) lived in owner-occupied housing units and 1,786 people (26.0%) lived in rental housing units.

Politics

References

http://eldorado2016.com/historical-places/el-dorado-county-and-communities/pollock-pines/

https://www.thepollockpinesepic.com/

External links
The Pollock Pines Epic - A history of the Pollock Pines area, c 1988-2008, Marilyn Parker

Census-designated places in El Dorado County, California
Populated places in the Sierra Nevada (United States)
Populated places established in 1936
1936 establishments in California
Census-designated places in California